Flavisolibacter metallilatus is a Gram-negative, rod-shaped, aerobic and non-motile   bacterium from the genus of Flavisolibacter which has been isolated from an air conditioning system from a car in Korea.

References

Chitinophagia
Bacteria described in 2018